Clarksville may refer to:

Canada 
 Clarksville, Alberta
 Clarksville, Nova Scotia

United States 
 Clarksville, Arkansas
 Clarksville, California
 Clarksville, Delaware
 Clarksville, Florida
 Clarksville, Idaho
 Clarksville, Illinois
 Clarksville, Indiana, in Clark County
 Clarksville, Hamilton County, Indiana
 Clarksville, Iowa
 Clarksville, Maryland
 Clarksville, Michigan
 Clarksville, Mississippi
 Clarksville, Missouri
 Clarksville Township, Merrick County, Nebraska
 Clarksville, New Hampshire
 Clarksville, New Jersey (disambiguation)
 Clarksville, New York (disambiguation)
 Clarksville, Ohio, in Clinton County
 Clarksville, Defiance County, Ohio
 Clarksville, Perry County, Ohio
 Clarksville, Oklahoma
 Clarksville, Pennsylvania
 Clarksville, Tennessee, the largest city with this name
 Clarksville, Texas
 Clarksville, Austin, Texas
 Clarksville, Virginia

Other places
 Clarksville, New Zealand
 Clarksville metropolitan area, in Tennessee and Kentucky

See also 
 Clarkesville (disambiguation)
 Clarkville (disambiguation)
 Clarksville City, Texas
 Clarksville Elementary School (disambiguation)
 Clarksville High School (disambiguation)
 Clarksville Historic District (disambiguation)
 "Last Train to Clarksville", 1966 song by The Monkees